Grand Theft Auto: The Trilogy – The Definitive Edition is a 2021 compilation of three action-adventure games in the Grand Theft Auto series: Grand Theft Auto III (2001), Grand Theft Auto: Vice City (2002), and Grand Theft Auto: San Andreas (2004). It was developed by Grove Street Games and published by Rockstar Games. All three games are remastered, with visual enhancements and gameplay upgrades. The games feature different protagonists and locations within the same continuity. Grand Theft Auto III follows silent protagonist Claude in Liberty City; Vice City, set in 1986, features ex-mobster Tommy Vercetti in the titular Vice City; and San Andreas, set in 1992, follows gangster Carl "CJ" Johnson within the fictional state of San Andreas.

The two-year development focused on maintaining the look and feel of the original games; the physics code was copied from the originals, and artificial intelligence was used to automatically upscale textures. The development team studied the distinctive qualities of the original games. They added several colouring, weathering, and lighting effects, as well as new assets from Grand Theft Auto V (2013). The team consulted with the original developers at Rockstar North when upgrading the character designs. Prior to release, existing versions of the three games were removed from sale from digital retailers, which led to criticism from audiences and journalists; in response, Rockstar restored the original versions on the Rockstar Store.

The Definitive Edition was released for Nintendo Switch, PlayStation 4, PlayStation 5, Windows, Xbox One, and Xbox Series X/S on 11 November 2021; Android and iOS versions are in development. The Windows launch was marred by problems with the Rockstar Games Launcher, rendering it unplayable for three days. The game received poor reviews; critics generally praised the enhanced visuals, upgraded lighting, improved controls, and added gameplay mechanics, but criticised its technical problems, art direction, and character models. It was one of the lowest-scoring games of 2021, and was the subject of review bombing on Metacritic. Rockstar apologised for the technical problems and announced its intentions to improve the game through updates.

Contents 

Grand Theft Auto: The Trilogy – The Definitive Edition contains three games in the Grand Theft Auto series: Grand Theft Auto III (2001), Grand Theft Auto: Vice City (2002), and Grand Theft Auto: San Andreas (2004). They are action-adventure games played from a third-person perspective wherein players complete missions—linear scenarios with set objectives—to progress through the story. Outside of missions, players can freely roam the open world and have the ability to complete optional side missions. Some areas of the games become unlocked as the player progresses through the storyline.

Grand Theft Auto III is set in Liberty City, loosely based on New York City; it follows a silent protagonist, Claude, who is betrayed and left for dead by his girlfriend during a robbery and embarks on a quest for revenge that leads him to become entangled in a world of crime, drugs, gang warfare, and corruption. Vice City, set in 1986 in the titular Vice City (based on Miami), follows mobster Tommy Vercetti who, after being released from prison and becoming caught up in an ambushed drug deal, begins slowly building an empire by seizing power from other criminal organisations in the city. San Andreas is set in 1992 within the fictional state of San Andreas, consisting of three main cities: Los Santos (based on Los Angeles), San Fierro (based on San Francisco), and Las Venturas (based on Las Vegas); the game follows former gangster Carl "CJ" Johnson, who returns home following his mother's murder and is drawn back into his former gang and a life of crime while clashing with corrupt authorities and powerful criminals.

All three titles are remastered for The Definitive Edition, including a rebuilt lighting system, upgraded vehicle and character models, new navigation and heads-up display designs, and improved shadows, reflections, and draw distances. The controls were updated to match those of Grand Theft Auto V (2013), and the checkpoint system was improved to allow for an automatic restart. On Nintendo Switch, the game includes gyro aiming and touchscreen support. Some music tracks and cheats from the original versions of the games were removed.

Development 
Grand Theft Auto: The Trilogy – The Definitive Edition was developed by Grove Street Games and published by Rockstar Games. Under its former name War Drum Studios, Grove Street Games previously developed mobile versions of the trilogy, as well as the PlayStation 3 and Xbox 360 versions of San Andreas. The Definitive Edition was in development for two years, and used Unreal Engine 4 for rendering; the original games used RenderWare. The development team found porting the game to the engine made it look "clean", requiring them to make it appear dirtier to maintain the original look. Rockstar had resisted the trend of video game remakes as the team found they required care and attention, but they ultimately felt the remaster was "a way to maintain the titles for the next decade-plus" without dealing with the outdated technology. They found Grand Theft Auto III the most difficult of the trilogy to update due to the outdated assets; in comparison, San Andreas was much easier, as the original art department had learned to take advantage of the hardware at the time.

The team wanted The Definitive Edition to maintain the feeling of the original games; as part of this, they copied the original physics code. They originally attempted to rebuild some of the main buildings from scratch, such as the player characters' houses, but noticed a discrepancy in quality compared to other buildings. Some assets were improved from the original games, while others were ultimately rebuilt entirely. The team used an artificial intelligence program to upscale textures before making manual adjustments; producer Rich Rosado estimated over 100,000 textures were changed. The added navigation feature was implemented using pathfinding as well as analysing the routes taken by the non-player characters (NPCs), though it required some manual adjustments; the team found these implementations to be "easy wins" due to the existing technology. They wanted The Definitive Edition to run smoothly across all platforms while taking advantage of the higher-end hardware.

The team studied all three games to determine their distinct qualities, such as Vice Citys "bright neons" and San Andreass orange sky. They added dynamic colours that shift throughout the day, and corrected the placement and movement of the Sun, Moon, stars, and clouds. They changed some weather effects, such as the falling of rain and accumulation of puddles and their reflections. While the original games used "baked lighting"—"lighting [that] would just come from nowhere because we just need to light the scene"—The Definitive Edition uses the lighting from the sky, which forced the team to add artificial lights to avoid darkness in some locations, such as lampposts in alleys. All trees and foliage in the games, as well as some interior design elements, were replaced with higher-quality assets from Grand Theft Auto V; the team wanted them to naturally blend into the environment.

Rosado claimed "the art challenge alone felt insurmountable early on" due to the scale of remastering three games simultaneously, particularly the immensity of San Andreas. The team avoided making the games look too realistic as they felt the characters—whose motion capture data was coded to the original caricaturised wire-frame models—would look out of place. They wanted the characters to maintain their original appearance, noting the game "must look like you remember it". They faced difficulty when working on characters, as they felt adding detail "where there was no detail before" might conflict with the player's "mental image" of the character designs; the team consulted developers at Rockstar North, including some of the games' original artists. Much of the material from the original games—such as the source audio, textures, reference material, and character models—were unable to be found due to a lack of archives, as the original development team "never thought [they would] have to revisit these projects".

Release 
The existence of The Definitive Edition was first reported in August 2021 by Kotaku, claiming its development was led by Rockstar Dundee. Media speculation continued in September after the Game Rating and Administration Committee in South Korea gave the trilogy a game rating, and in early October after an update to the Rockstar Games Launcher included data referencing the game, such as logos, art, and achievements. Rockstar announced the trilogy on 8 October 2021, coinciding with the 20th anniversary month of Grand Theft Auto IIIs original release. It revealed the trilogy would feature "across-the-board upgrades ... while still maintaining the classic look and feel of the originals".

Existing versions of the three games were removed from sale from digital retailers on consoles and Windows on 13 October 2021. Audiences and journalists criticised the move, citing concerns with video game preservation, a lack of choice between versions, and the potential removal of music due to expired licences, which had occurred with previous re-releases. Wesley Yin-Poole of Eurogamer called the decision a "blow to video game preservation" and said it was poor for player choice. Upon the game's release, Rockstar confirmed the music matched the trilogy's most recent re-releases in 2014, with over 30 songs missing from Vice City and San Andreas collectively. Some cheats were removed as they "didn't play well" in Unreal Engine. On 19 November, Rockstar announced the original versions of the games would be released as a bundle on the Rockstar Store; they were delivered for free to owners of The Definitive Edition on 3 December, and remained available with all purchases of the game until 30 June 2022. Customers who bought The Definitive Edition through the Rockstar Games Launcher were eligible to receive one free Rockstar game between 20 December 2021 and 5 January 2022.

Preorders for The Definitive Edition began on 22 October 2021, alongside the release of the first full trailer and screenshots demonstrating the graphical enhancements. The game was released for Nintendo Switch, PlayStation 4, PlayStation 5, Windows, Xbox One, and Xbox Series X/S on 11 November 2021. Physical versions for PlayStation 4, Xbox One, and Xbox Series X were released on 17 December 2021, and for Switch on 11 February 2022; all physical versions were initially scheduled for 7 December 2021. The Windows version supports Nvidia DLSS, while the PlayStation 5 and Xbox Series X versions display at 4K resolution with up to 60 frames per second. The game was made available on Steam on 19 January 2023, allowing Steam Deck support; it will be released through the Epic Games Store later in January. Android and iOS versions of the game were scheduled to be released in the first half of 2022; in May 2022, Rockstar's parent company Take-Two Interactive updated the mobile release window to its 2023 fiscal year, ending 31 March 2023. In November 2022, Take-Two replaced the release date with "TBA".

The game was expected to launch on 11 November at 10 a.m. Eastern Standard Time (UTC−05:00), but an error on the PlayStation Store caused pre-orders to unlock at midnight locally, granting players in Australia and New Zealand access more than 24 hours before planned on PlayStation 4 and PlayStation 5. The digital listing was temporarily removed from the PlayStation Store in the interim. Upon the game's release, the Rockstar Games Launcher went offline for a period of roughly 28 hours for "maintenance", rendering the game unplayable and unpurchaseable on Windows; the game remained unavailable after the launcher was restored, while Rockstar "remove[d] files unintentionally included" in the game. Based on information discovered by data miners, journalists suggested those files included the removed radio station songs, hidden notes from the developers, and San Andreass controversial Hot Coffee minigame. Following three days of unavailability, the Windows version was restored on 14 November. On 19 November 2021, Rockstar announced it would work to fix and improve the game through updates, the first of which was released the following day. On 30 November, an option was added to San Andreas to view ground fog following criticism of its absence. An update in February 2022 resolved more than 100 bugs.

Reception

Critical response 

The Definitive Edition received "mixed or average reviews" for PlayStation 5 and Xbox Series X/S, based on forty-six and eleven reviews, respectively, and "generally unfavorable reviews" for Nintendo Switch and Windows based on fourteen and eight critics, according to review aggregator Metacritic. It was one of the lowest-scoring games on Metacritic in 2021. Jordan Middler of Video Games Chronicle described the collection as "far from 'definitive, and Chris Shive of Hardcore Gamer wrote "these games are all masterpieces and as such deserve a better collection than this". GameSpots Justin Clark was confused as to why Rockstar Games, known for its high-quality and detailed games like Red Dead Redemption 2 (2018), would publish a remaster "that turns its most iconic games into app store shovelware". Jeuxvideo.coms Jerome Joffard felt the games maintained their original charm and feeling of freedom.

Destructoids Dan Roemer wrote the updated visuals "look pretty solid", particularly praising the neon signs of Vice City. Screen Rants Christopher J. Teuton said the games "look better here than they ever have before", excluding mods, though noted the increased draw distance in San Andreas made the map feel simpler and smaller. Several critics echoed the latter sentiment; Video Games Chronicles Middler said it "feels like something you were never supposed to see", and IGNs Tristan Ogilvie wrote it "completely shatters the convincing illusion of scale". Zack Zwiezen of Kotaku described the improved graphics as "at times stunning and distracting", praising the improvements and additions of trees and foliage, but noting some broken or improperly-upscaled textures. VideoGamer.coms Josh Wise found the improved draw distances and lighting removed the dirtier mood of the originals, with Grand Theft Auto III and San Andreas missing the "grey-green murk" and the "beer-tinted haze", respectively. Clark of GameSpot echoed this sentiment and stressed the importance of art direction, noting the mood and personality of the games, cities, and characters had been largely lost.

Jeuxvideo.coms Joffard felt the improved lighting system highlights the themes of each game: the darker atmosphere of Grand Theft Auto III, bright colours of Vice City, and dusty roads of San Andreas. Sam Machkovech of Ars Technica called the lighting the "best part" of the game, and Middler of Video Games Chronicle felt it "captures the vibe perfectly", especially in Vice City, though noted the sunlight was occasionally too bright. NMEs Jordan Olomon wrote the improved lighting effects "make it feel like what you imagined these games looked like when you were a kid". IGNs Ogilvie thought the lighting was inconsistent, enjoying the neon lights of Vice City and the general reflections in cars and puddles, but criticising the intense shadows and distracting rain effects; The Guardians Keza MacDonald called the rain effects "so ugly that they obscure your view", and GameSpots Clark said they render the games "virtually unplayable". Several critics found the lighting changes would often make scenes too dark.

Critics praised the addition of mission checkpoints, the weapon wheel and map navigation, and the improved shooting controls, which many felt made the game easier and more enjoyable. Conversely, while IGNs Ogilvie enjoyed the addition of the map navigation, he noted some inconsistencies when attempting to place a custom waypoint while in a mission; he felt the mission checkpoints remained too unforgiving and found the auto-targeting to be inconsistent across the three games, with San Andreas performing better than the others. Destructoids Roemer considered the combat disappointingly similar to the original games, calling it "incredibly rough and unforgiving at times". Screen Rants Teuton criticised the removal of the cinematic and top-down camera angles from Grand Theft Auto III. Some critics voiced their disapproval at the removal of some radio station songs. Shive of Hardcore Gamer questioned the removal of the Confederate flag from a character's outfit, and Joffard of Jeuxvideo.com criticised the removal of the two-player mode from San Andreas.

The updated character designs received mixed responses. Machkovech of Ars Technica wrote they "generally shine" in comparison to the originals, though noted some "look pretty bad". IGNs Ogilvie similarly thought the designs were only occasionally distracting during cutscenes. Shive of Hardcore Gamer liked Claude's new character model, but felt  Tommy looked "too young" and some NPC models "look like horrible mutant abominations". Olomon of NME described the models as "outright ridiculous". Joffard of Jeuxvideo.com felt the cartoonish designs of the new character models negatively juxtaposed the realistic graphical changes, and made several characters lose some of their personality and charisma; Middler of Video Games Chronicle concurred, noting "it doesn't seem like every character was given the care and attention they deserve". Polygons Cameron Kunzelman and Destructoids Roemer criticised Tommy's updated model, describing him as a "G.I. Joe doll" and "a bloated Ken doll", respectively. GameSpots Clark called the character models "absolutely hideous".

Several reviewers recalled encountering technical errors and crashes. The Guardians MacDonald wrote the "remasters feel less stable" than the original games; Teuton of Screen Rant found Vice City to be the most unstable of the three games. Ars Technicas Machkovech felt the game did not take advantage of the advanced hardware like the Xbox Series X, and criticised the "botched" high dynamic range; Push Squares Sammy Barker noted significant frame rate drops on the PlayStation 5 version. The Nintendo Switch version of the game was particularly criticised for its technical flaws; Nintendo Lifes PJ O'Reilly censured the awkward shooting controls, frequent frame rate dips, and some character designs, though enjoyed the graphical upgrade for the world and lighting, particularly in Vice City. Middler of Video Games Chronicle denounced the Switch version's low-quality textures and lower display resolution compared to other platforms. Machkovech of Ars Technica criticised the game's pricing and frame rate issues, and noted he experienced at least one hardware crash in all three games. Playing on the Steam Deck in 2023, Rock Paper Shotguns James Archer called the games "still a bit crap", citing technical glitches and bugs, performance issues, poor lighting and animations, and common frame rate drops.

Audience response 
The game was the subject of review bombing on Metacritic, resulting in a user review score of 0.4/10 at its nadir, among the lowest on the site. Reporters noted some user reviews cited a dislike of the game's art style and the lack of advance copies sent to press, with several demanding refunds. Journalists noted a general backlash from players due to the unusual look of some updated character models, textual errors on in-game surfaces, issues related to draw distance increase, and model and physics glitches. Following criticism, mods were created to improve the game's rain and restore removed content.

Developer and publisher response 
In response to the game's negative reception, Grove Street Games chief executive officer (CEO) Thomas Williamson said he was "enjoying this unparalleled level of scrutiny on our studio". On 19 November 2021, Rockstar apologised for the technical problems, admitting the games "did not launch in a state that meets our own standards of quality, or the standards our fans have come to expect". Rockstar reported members of the development team had been harassed online, and urged its community to "maintain a respectful and civil discourse". In January 2022, Strauss Zelnick, CEO of Take-Two Interactive, said the game had a "glitch" at launch was resolved and the game performed "just great for the company"; some journalists felt Zelnick's comments were an attempt to downplay the release's major issues. The following month, Zelnick reiterated the game "definitely had some quality issues" and the company "did fall short", but noted the issues were being addressed. According to industry sources, the game's backlash resulted in Rockstar shelving remasters of Grand Theft Auto IV (2008) and Red Dead Redemption (2010), instead increasing focus on development for the next entry in the Grand Theft Auto series.

Sales 
In the United Kingdom, The Definitive Edition was the eighth-best-selling game in November 2021, and the 20th-best-selling in December; the chart combines physical and digital sales for consoles, though the game was only available digitally in November. Following its physical release, the game charted sixth in the United Kingdom's weekly boxed charts; 67 per cent of copies sold were for PlayStation 4, with the remainder on Xbox. In its second week, the physical version fell to 23rd after sales dropped 70 per cent, and it exited the top 40 the following week. On the PlayStation Store in November 2021, the game was the third-best-selling PlayStation 5 game in Europe and North America; it was the sixth-best-selling for PlayStation 4 in North America, and the eighth in Europe. In December, it was the 20th-best-selling PlayStation 5 game in Europe, and it placed 17th in the region for the year overall. In the United States, the physical version was the 57th-best-selling game of January 2022, and the 16th-best-selling of February.

Journalists estimated the game could have sold up to ten million copies by December 2021. In February 2022, Zelnick said sales exceeded expectations and the company felt "very good about how the title has performed commercially", though analyst Michael Pachter of Wedbush Securities said "everyone knew [it] underperformed".

Notes

References

External links 
 

2021 video games
Action-adventure games
Android (operating system) games
Cultural depictions of the Mafia
Trilogy The Definitive Edition
Grove Street Games games
IOS games
Nintendo Switch games
Open-world video games
Organized crime video games
PlayStation 4 games
PlayStation 5 games
Single-player video games
Trilogies
Unreal Engine games
Video game compilations
Video game remasters
Video games set in 1986
Video games set in 1992
Video games set in 2001
Video games set in Florida
Video games set in the United States
Video games set on fictional islands
Windows games
Xbox One games
Xbox Series X and Series S games